Libin may refer to:

People
 Alvin Libin (born 1931), Canadian businessman and philanthropist
 Liu Libin (born 1995), Chinese volleyball player
 Phil Libin (born 1972), Russian entrepreneur
 Wang Libin (born 1963), Chinese basketball player
 Xiang Libin (born 1967), Chinese researcher
 Zalmon Libin (1872-1955), American playwright
 Zhang Libin (born 1955), Chinese roboticist

Places
 Libín, Czech Republic
 Libin, Belgium, Walloon municipality located in the province of Luxembourg

Other
 Libin Cardiovascular Institute of Alberta, Canada